Minamo Island is the largest of several small islands which lie in the narrow inlet between the Skallen Hills and Skallen Glacier, along the coast of Queen Maud Land, Antarctica. It was mapped from surveys and air photos by the Japanese Antarctic Research Expedition (JARE), 1957–62, and was named by JARE Headquarters in 1972.

See also 
 List of antarctic and sub-antarctic islands

References

Islands of Queen Maud Land
Prince Harald Coast